THB may refer to:

Tanah Abang station
Tetrahydrobiopterin, a chemical
Tetrahydrocorticosterone, a hormone
Thai baht, the currency of Thailand (ISO 4217 code: THB)
THB (comics), and the character Tri-Hydro Bi-Oxygenate
Three Horses Beer of Madagascar
Toronto, Hamilton and Buffalo Railway reporting mark
ThB, Bachelor of Theology degree